"In the Meantime" is the debut single of English alternative rock band Spacehog, from their debut album, Resident Alien (1995). It samples the Penguin Cafe Orchestra song "Telephone and Rubber Band". Released in 1996, the single peaked atop the US Billboard Mainstream Rock chart and the UK Rock Chart. It additionally reached number 32 on the Billboard Hot 100 and number 29 on the UK Singles Chart while reaching the top 50 in Australia, Canada, Iceland, New Zealand and Sweden.

Meaning
In a 2018 interview, lead singer Royston Langdon said:

Track listings and formats
 US CD and cassette single
 "In the Meantime"  – 5:01
 "To Be a Millionaire... Was It Likely?" (live) – 3:41

 Australian and European CD single
 "In the Meantime" (edit) – 4:31
 "Zeroes"  – 6:38
 "To Be a Millionaire... Was It Likely?" (live) – 3:35

Charts

Weekly charts

Year-end charts

Release history

In other media
The song plays over the credits of Michael Almereyda's 1994 film Nadja.

Mashup artist Girl Talk layered "In the Meantime" over the Terror Squad hip-hop song, "Lean Back" in his album All Day.

An excerpt of the re-recorded version of the song is used as the opening theme to the VH1 television series  Hindsight in addition to appearing on the show's second episode.

The song features as a playable track in videogames Guitar Hero 5 (having been re-recorded by the band) and Rock Band 3 (in its original version present in Resident Alien).

The song is the opening music to David Spade's 1998 HBO special Take the Hit.

The song is featured in the series premiere and season 1 finale of the Netflix show Everything Sucks!, the 2009 comedy film Fanboys and an episode of the ABC show, Schooled, "CB Saves the Planet".

The song is featured in the first trailer for Guardians of the Galaxy Vol. 3.

References

External links
 

1995 songs
1996 debut singles
Elektra Records singles
Glam rock songs
Music videos directed by Jake Scott (director)
Sire Records singles
Television drama theme songs